Trump National Golf Club may refer to:

Trump National Golf Club (Bedminster, New Jersey)
Trump National Golf Club (Colts Neck, New Jersey)
Trump National Golf Club Hudson Valley (Hopewell Junction, New York)
Trump National Golf Club (Jupiter, Florida)
Trump National Golf Club (Los Angeles)
Trump National Golf Club (Philadelphia)
Trump National Golf Club (Washington, D.C.)
Trump National Golf Club (Westchester, New York)

See also
 List of things named after Donald Trump